Cannabis in Uganda is illegal; the drug is locally referred to as bhang. Cannabis is the only drug produced within the country.

History
In as early as 1902, the British banned the production of "opium" in Uganda, noting that opium "includes... also the preparation known as bhang, ganja, churus, and chandoo natron". A 1902 British ethnological work noted that cannabis was used in Uganda, only by men, and particularly smoked in a water pipe. Young men of fighting age were not allowed to smoke cannabis.

Cultivation
Locally known as bhang, it is believed to be the only drug grown in Uganda. Cultivation is most prevalent in eastern Uganda, especially in Bugiri, Busia, Iganga, Kayunga, Mayuge, and Mukono. Ugandan cannabis is mainly smuggled to neighbouring African countries like the Democratic Republic of Congo and Sudan.

Legality
Although cannabis in Uganda is illegal, law enforcement is poor. The 2010 International Narcotics Control Strategy Report highlighted that there were only two detection dogs for conducting drug searches and no drug test kits or X-ray machines to detect drugs, along with the fact that the local police were both corrupt and inadequately trained. From 2008 to 2010, the government's Anti-Narcotics Unit (ANU) seized  of cannabis and officially arrested some 482 people for possession of the drug. The ANU also reported that  of cannabis plants were destroyed from 2008 to 2009.

The export of cannabis for medicinal purposes was approved by the Ugandan Ministry of Health in January 2020, which stipulated among other things that all cannabis exporters had to have a minimum capital of USh  (US$5,000). Prior to this, however, Industrial Hemp Uganda, a private company based in Hima, Kasese District, had already been exporting medicinal cannabis to Germany and China.

References

Uganda
Drugs in Uganda